"Thinking of You" is the third single from freestyle singer Sa-Fire's 1988 eponymous debut album. She collaborated on its authorship and composition with Russell DeSalvo and Bob B Steele. The recording was produced by Aldo Marin and Carlos Rodgers.

The single debuted at number 80 on the Billboard Hot 100 chart dated February 4, 1989 and peaked at number 12 thirteen weeks later. It charted for 24 weeks.

Charts

Year-end charts

References

1988 songs
1989 singles
Pop ballads
Sa-Fire songs
Songs written by Russ DeSalvo